Commander Zafar Muhammad Khan (death: 4 December 1971) was a naval officer in the Pakistan Navy who was the Captain and Commanding Officer of  during the Indo-Pakistani War of 1971. The PNS Ghazi was sunk under mysterious circumstances while on a reconnaissance mine-laying mission in the approaches to the Indian port of Vishakapatnum (Bay of Bengal) and sank at about 00:10 hours. A total of 93 men, including 11 commissioned officers, and 82 non-commissioned officers lost their lives. In 1971, he was one of the naval officers who were posthumously awarded Hilal-i-Jur'at for their actions.

Naval career
Khan graduated from Karachi University with a B.Sc. in Electrical engineering in 1956. He gained a commission in the Pakistan Navy in 1956, and was sent to Britannia Royal Naval College at Dartmouth to take the General Naval Course (GNC). He began his active duty in 1960 when he graduated from there. He briefly served in PNS Ghazi as an Electrical Engineer Officer (EEO), and actively participated in Indo-Pakistani War of 1965. He then participated and also served as a torpedo officer (TO) in Operation Dwarka on 7 September 1965. After the war, he taught electrical engineering courses as an Associate professor at the Pakistan Navy Engineering College. He was promoted Lieutenant Commander in 1967, and finally promoted Commander in 1971.

Four days later, he became a commanding officer of the PNS Ghazi. In late 1971, the political crisis and tensions between East and West Pakistan were heightened. Naval Intelligence (Pakistan Navy) realised that Indian intervention in Pakistan's affairs was inevitable. Sensing a deteriorating military scenario with the move of Indian aircraft carrier  close to East Pakistan, the Pakistan Navy launched a covert reconnaissance mission codenamed "Operation Falcon". It was followed by deploying PNS Ghazi around the Indian peninsula from the Arabian Sea to the Bay of Bengal.  was deployed near the coast of West Pakistan under the command of Captain Ahmed Tasnim.

In the night of 14 November 1971, PNS Ghazi sailed out of harbour under the command of Commander Zafar Muhammad Khan with 92 men on board. It was expected to report back to its home base on 26 November 1971. According to Naval Intelligence, two different missions were assigned to PNS Ghazi. Copies of the missions were handed over to Commander Khan, marked "Top Secret". The Operation's Commander had instructed Commander Zafar Khan not to open the files until PNS Ghazi approached Visakhapatnam port.

Prior to her deployment, Ghazi continued to experience equipment failures and reportedly had aging issues. Since it was the only submarine of the Pakistan Navy and had the range and capability to undertake operations in the distant waters controlled by India, Ghazi was pressed into operation to destroy or damage the aircraft carrier, INS Vikrant, of the Indian navy.  On 14 November 1971, she quietly sailed 3,000 miles (4,800 km) around the Indian peninsula from the Arabian Sea to the Bay of Bengal under the command of Zafar Muhammad who was commanding a submarine for the first time, with 10 officers and 82 sailors. Ghazi was on a two-fold mission: the primary goal was to locate and sink Vikrant and secondary was to mine India's eastern seaboard which was to be fulfilled irrespective of the accomplishment of the first.

The PNS Ghazi had achieved the first objectives by laying the mines. On 23 November, as part of second assignment, PNS Ghazi under Commander Khan began to look for INS Vikrant. The mysterious sinking of Ghazi took place on 4 December 1971 during its hunt to find INS Vikrant and/or during the minelaying mission on the Visakhapatnam Port, Bay of Bengal. The cause of the sinking is still unknown, and Indian and Pakistani sources have different views. Indian officials claim that Indian navy was responsible for sinking of PNS Ghazi. However, both the neutral sources and Indian military officials have rejected the Indian version on sinking of PNS Ghazi. Pakistani officials state that PNS Ghazi suffered an internal explosion while it was laying mines. The internal explosion was the cause of sinking of the submarine.

In 2003, the Indian Navy again sent its divers to overlook its investigation and the divers recovered some items including the war logs, officials backup tapes from her computers, and mission files that were displaced in Eastern Naval Command of Indian Navy, but the divers who studied the wreckage confirmed that the submarine must have suffered an internal explosion which blew up its mines and torpedoes. Another theory suggests an explosion of hydrogen gas which violently built up inside the submarine while its batteries were being charged underwater.

In 2010, Lieutenant-General J.F.R Jacob of Eastern Command  mentioned in an article that "Ghazi was destroyed in an accident in which Indian Navy  was not involved. There were many opinions from authors of the Indian side who also shared this skepticism of the Indian Navy’s official stance."

In 2010, it was reported that Indian navy had destroyed all records of sinking Ghazi submarine. Vice admiral G M Hiranandani who was tasked with writing the official history of the navy. He stated that he was unable to obtain any old files regarding PNS Ghazi sinking. Those old files were destroyed. One of the retired navy officer who saw action in 1971 claims that the destruction of the Ghazi papers and those of army in Kolkata depicts the many instances when Indian war history has been delibarelty falsified. He further stated that 'We have enough heroes. In fog of war, many myth and false hero may have been created and many left unsung'.

Personal life
Zafar married Lalarukh Zafar in December 1964 and had one son named Sameer Zafar Khan.

Media
The Pakistan Navy has paid tribute to Commander Zafar and the crew of PNS Ghazi by establishing monuments of the fallen officers. In 1996, a dramatization of PNS Ghazi, as PNS Ghazi (Shaheed), was filmed, and it was financed and produced by ISPR of the Pakistan Defense Forces. It was here that the Pakistan Navy first outlined the naval career of Commander Zafar Muhammad Khan and other officers. A well-known Pakistani actor, Shabbir Jan, portrayed the life and career of Commander Zafar Muhammad Khan.

Honours
PNS Zafar: Named after Commander Zafar Muhammad Khan (Shaheed). The establishment was commissioned on 15 March 1974, and serves as the depot for all Pakistan Navy personnel stationed at Islamabad.
Zafar Chowk: Named after Commander Zafar Muhammad Khan (shaheed). In order to perpetuate his memory, the naval and Islamabad municipal authorities have named the road crossing which gives access to Naval Residential Area in Islamabad "Zafar Chowk".

References

Pakistan Navy officers
Tasnim, Capt. Comdr Ahmed
Submarine commanders
Year of birth missing
University of Karachi alumni
Graduates of Britannia Royal Naval College
Pakistani military engineers
1971 deaths
Muhajir people
Pakistani military personnel killed in action